Henry Franklin Fraley Jr. (born September 21, 1977) is an American football coach and former center who is the offensive line coach for the Detroit Lions of the National Football League (NFL). He previously served as an assistant offensive line coach for the Lions and Minnesota Vikings. Originally from Gaithersburg, Maryland, Fraley played college football at Robert Morris University and was signed as an undrafted free agent in 2000 by the Pittsburgh Steelers. Waived before the start of the 2000 season, Fraley was claimed off waivers by the Philadelphia Eagles, for whom he started at center for five seasons. He lost his starting job to Jamaal Jackson before the 2006 season and was subsequently traded to the Cleveland Browns. He played for the Browns for four seasons and the St. Louis Rams for one season.

Early years
Fraley attended Gaithersburg High School and as a senior in 1995, he helped them to the Maryland state championship game.

Playing career

College
Fraley's career began as a non-scholarship player at Division I-AA Robert Morris University near Pittsburgh. He is listed as the second athlete to ever have his number, 75, retired from Robert Morris University. Fraley holds a degree in Organizational Leadership.

National Football League

Pittsburgh Steelers
Fraley was signed as an undrafted free agent by the Pittsburgh Steelers in 2000.

Philadelphia Eagles
Fraley was claimed off waivers in 2000 by the Philadelphia Eagles after being released by the Steelers. He was inactive for the entire 2000 season. In his first ever NFL game (vs St. Louis Rams on September 9, 2001), Fraley was fined for an illegal downfield block. He started in 15 games in 2001.

Fraley started in all 16 regular season games along with two postseason games during the 2002 season. He was part of an offensive line that helped the Eagles offense to 25.9 points per game, the fourth highest in the NFL.

Fraley started in all 16 regular season games in 2003 and 2004. In 2004, he was an important part of the offensive line that helped the Eagles to 4,208 passing yards, a team record and 386 points, the third most in team history.

He started the first eight games of the 2005 season, but suffered a shoulder injury at the Washington Redskins on November 6 which ruled him out for the rest of the season.

Cleveland Browns
On September 2, 2006, Fraley was traded to the Cleveland Browns in exchange for a draft pick in the 2008 NFL Draft after losing his starting job to Jamaal Jackson. He made his Browns debut versus the New Orleans Saints on September 10 and started in all 16 games.

It was said by teammate wide receiver Joe Jurevicius that Fraley should have been considered the offensive MVP in the 2006 season, due to his line calling and blue-collar work ethic.

Prior to the start of free agency in 2007, the Browns re-signed Fraley to a four-year contract for an undisclosed amount. He made his 100th NFL career start versus the Buffalo Bills on December 16.

He was released by the Browns on March 3, 2010.

St. Louis Rams
On March 14, 2010, Fraley signed with the St. Louis Rams. He was released on September 4, 2011, after just one season with the Rams.

Coaching career

University of San Diego
On April 7, 2012, Fraley was hired by the University of San Diego as the football team's offensive line coach.

San Jose State University
On January 31, 2013, San Jose State University hired Fraley as offensive line coach for the Spartans football team under Ron Caragher.

Minnesota Vikings
On February 10, 2014, Fraley was hired by the Minnesota Vikings as an assistant offensive line coach.

UCLA
On January 21, 2017, the UCLA Bruins hired Fraley as their offensive line coach.

Detroit Lions
On February 16, 2018, Fraley was hired by the Detroit Lions as an assistant offensive line coach.

On January 7, 2020, Fraley was promoted to offensive line coach.

Personal life
Hank grew up in Gaithersburg Maryland attending Gaithersburg High School. Prior to starting his NFL career, Fraley planned on teaching history and coaching football. He is married to Danielle (May 26, 2006), and they live in Canton, Michigan with their five children. They have one yellow lab, Wingman, a Leonberger named Uschi and a pug named Daisy and a Chocolate Lab named Bently.

References

External links
San Diego Toreros bio

1977 births
Living people
People from Gaithersburg, Maryland
People from Woolwich Township, New Jersey
Players of American football from Maryland
American football centers
American football offensive guards
Detroit Lions coaches
Robert Morris Colonials football players
Pittsburgh Steelers players
Philadelphia Eagles players
Cleveland Browns players
St. Louis Rams players
San Diego Toreros football coaches
Gaithersburg High School alumni